Mochdre is a small village and larger community in Montgomeryshire, Powys, Wales. The community includes Penstrowed (which claims to be the smallest hamlet in Wales) and the much larger settlement of Stepaside. The community had a population of 494 as of the 2011 UK Census.

Geography
Its tributary, Mochdre Brook runs through the village in a narrow steep-sided valley.

Name
The name means "pigs settlement", from moch, meaning pigs, and tre for settlement or town. It is possible that the name refers to Mochdre in the Fourth Branch of the Mabinogion, the tale of Math, son of Mathonwy, where Gwydion takes the pigs of Pryderi, staying overnight between the nearby commote of Ceri and Arwystli.

History

In 1872, it was a parish in the Newtown district called Moughtrey or Mochtref, with Eskirgilog and Moughtreyllan townships. At that time, there were 95 houses, a population of 526, and was 5,025 acres.

The church, in the diocese of St. Asaph in the late 19th century, was an ancient church in poor shape as of 1859. With a roof dating from  the 15th century, the rest of the Church of All Saints was rebuilt in 1867. All Saints is a parish of the Mission Area of Cedewain, Church in Wales.

Lake Mochdre, a former reservoir, later a fish farm, now a fishing venue, was created by damming a tributary stream.

Governance
Since the May 1999 local government elections the community has been covered by the electoral ward of Llandinam, which elects a county councillor to Powys County Council.

The community also elects up to seven community councillors to Mochdre with Penstrowed Community Council.

References

Communities in Powys